C17orf53 is a gene in humans that encodes a protein known as C17orf53, uncharacterized protein C17orf53. It has been shown to target the nucleus, with minor localization in the cytoplasm. Based on current findings C17orf53 is predicted to perform functions of transport, however further research into the protein could provide more specific evidence regarding its function.

Gene

Location
C17orf53 is located on the long arm of chromosome 17, and is 16,727 bp long. C17orf53 spans from 44,145,203 to 44,161,929, and is located on the positive stand.

Gene neighborhood
Neighboring genes of C17orf53 are that of RNU6-131, RNA U6 Small Nuclear 131 Pseudogene, and ASB16, Ankyrin Repeat And SOCS Box Containing 16.

Expression
C17orf53 has been observed to be expressed ubiquitously across almost all tissue types of the body. Expression levels for C17orf53 are observed to be significantly high for tissue types including the pons, the thalamus, the superior cervical ganglion, the testis, the heart, cardiac myocytes, and multiple types of lymphoma Furthermore, based on in situ hybridization data, the hypothalamus exhibits high expression of C17orf53, responsible for relaying of sensory information, in contrast to the low expression of C17orf53 in the mesencephalon region of the brain, responsible for vision, hearing, and motor control.

Transcript variants
The coding region of C17orf53 consists of 2699 base pairs and encodes for a protein that is 647 amino acids long. Per NCBI AceView, the transcription of C17orf53 produces nine alternatively spliced mRNAs and 17 distinct gt-ag introns Of these nine alternatively spliced variants four distinct protein products are formed.

Homology

Paralogs
No paralogs of C17orf53 exist. There also exist no gene duplications.

Orthologs
Listed in the table to the right is a selection of C17orf53 orthologs of varying relatedness levels. Orthologs of the human protein C17orf53 are listed in a descending order based on date of divergence and percent sequence identity.

Evolutionary History 

Based on the ortholog table and phylogenetic tree listed to the right, the C17orf53 gene diverged around 1624 MYA when Eukaryotes broke off from Prokaryotes and Archaea. Since then the gene has diverged rapidly, comparable to the speed of fibrinogen. Furthermore, the most distantly related ortholog, Terenaya hassleriana, has three distinct isoforms of its own.

Homologous domains
C17orf53 falls within two distinct families; DUF4539, a domain of unknown function, and PRR18 super family, which consists of a proline rich family found in Eukaryotes. The proline rich family 18 domain as well as the domain of unknown function are conserved in all known orthologs of C17orf53.

Protein

General properties
The molecular weight of C17orf53 is 69 kiloDaltons. The isoelectric point is 5.85. The protein sequence of C17orf53 is both Proline and Glutamine rich, while low in Tyrosine. Aside from Proline, Glutamine, and Tyrosine, there exists a relatively even distribution of amino acids in the protein product of C17orf53. Additionally, the most distantly related orthologs display the most variance in amino acid composition.

Post-translational modifications 

 Phosphorylation: A large number of predicted phosphorylation sites could indicate that protein receptors regulating the protein are turned on and off. This is especially important in the proline rich family as well as the domain of unknown function.
 Glycation: The protein product of C17orf53 also displays a decent amount of glycation throughout the protein product. This may indicate that this protein is the start to a pathway that leads to advanced glycation end products, which have been found to be implicated in many chronic diseases such as cardiovascular problems. This aligns with previous research indicating that there is high expression of this protein in the heart.
 o-glycosylation: As noted by the conceptual translation there are some o-glycosylation sites located around the proline rich family 18 domain. O-glycosylation indicates the attachment of a sugar molecule to an oxygen atom in the amino acid sequence. This is said to occur in the cytoplasm, a minor predicted localization for the C17orf53 protein product.
 NES Sites: Nuclear export signals are located in the protein product. This indicates that the protein is likely involved in the transport out of the cell nucleus and into the cytoplasm.

Secondary structure 

The secondary structure of C17orf53 consists of all three structure types; Alpha helix, Beta sheet, and random coils, with the majority of its structure taking on a random coil form.

Tertiary Structure 
Shown in the figure to the right is the predicted tertiary structure of protein C17orf53. This predicted tertiary structure has been found to be 92.7% similar to 3IXZ, also known as Pig gastric H+/K+-ATPase complexed with aluminium fluoride, which is an ATP proton pump involved in creating a proton gradient across the gastric membrane.  Furthermore, the tertiary structure of C17orf53 has also been shown to be 90.6% similar to that of 3B8EC, a sodium potassium pump. These findings support the prediction that C17orf53 is a protein involved in transportation mechanisms.

Subcellular localization

The protein product of C17orf53 has been shown to target the nucleus, with minor localization in the cytoplasm.

Interacting proteins

Listed in the table below are interacting proteins of C17orf53, and their known functions in the human body. As noted by the table below and the visual representation of interacting proteins, similar to the post translational modifications and tertiary structure, C17orf53 is likely linked to pathways involved in the transfer out of the nucleus into the cytoplasm as indicated by Expo1 and TRIM33.

References

Proteins